AMP Capital is a large global investment manager headquartered in Sydney, Australia. Its owner, AMP Group, was established in 1849, and is one of Australia's largest retail and corporate pension providers. AMP Capital has a strategic alliance with Mitsubishi UFJ Trust and Banking Corporation.

Locations
In addition to its operations in Australia and New Zealand, AMP Capital has a growing international presence with offices in China, Dubai, Hong Kong, India, Japan, Luxembourg, Singapore, the United Kingdom and the United States.

List of shopping centres

Australia

New South Wales
 Casula Mall
 Dapto Mall
 Macquarie Centre
 Marrickville Metro
 Northbridge Plaza
 Royal Randwick Shopping Centre
 Westfield Liverpool (50%)
 Westfield Warringah Mall (50%)

Victoria
 Malvern Central Shopping Centre
 Stud Park Shopping Centre
 Westfield Southland (50%)

Queensland
 Pacific Fair
 Indooroopilly Shopping Centre
 Newstead Gasworks
 Marketplace Warner
 Brickworks Centre
 Stockland Townsville (50%)

South Australia
 Westfield Tea Tree Plaza (50%)

Western Australia
 Westfield Booragoon - 50%
 Karrinyup Shopping Centre
 Ocean Keys

New Zealand
 Bayfair Shopping Centre
 Botany Town Centre
 Manukau Supa Centa
 The Palms

History
On 9 December 2011, AMP announced a strategic business alliance between AMP Capital and 
Mitsubishi UFJ Trust and Banking Corporation (MUTB), a leading Japanese trust bank which provides services to institutions and retail clients across retail and corporate banking, trust assets, real estate and global markets. MUTB acquired a minority interest in AMP Capital. The alliance will give AMP access to 80 percent of Japan's institutional investors, around 14 percent of its retail and high net worth banking networks and 100 retail securities brokerage branches. In 2020, AMP Limited repurchased MUTB’s shareholding in AMP Capital.

AMP Capital also has a number of joint venture companies in Asia. It has a 50% stake in AIMS AMP Capital in Singapore, a joint venture REIT management company co-owned with AIMS Financial Group, as well as 15% in China Life AMP Asset Management.

In February 2021, AMP Limited entered into a non-binding Heads of Agreement to investigate the formation of a joint venture with Ares Management. After these plans were cancelled, AMP announced in April 2021 it planned to demerge the business and list it on the Australian Securities Exchange. In April 2022, AMP announced it had dropped this plan and instead sold AMP Capital's real estate and domestic infrastructure equity business to Dexus and international infrastructure equity business to DigitalBridge.

Accolades
AMP Capital is ranked among the top 10 infrastructure managers globally and is one of the largest real estate managers in Asia as well as providing commercial, industrial and retail property management services. AMP Capital is among the top 6 in Asia for private equity (funds-of-funds) as well as managing investments in fixed income and equities.

References

External links
 Official website
 Official website - Australia
 Official website - New Zealand
 Official website - Japan
 Official website - AMP Capital Shopping Centres

Companies based in Sydney
Financial services companies based in Sydney
Financial services companies established in 1849
Investment companies of Australia
1949 establishments in Australia